Gidea Park Carriage Holding Sidings is a stabling point located in Gidea Park, Greater London, England. The depot is situated on the Great Eastern Main Line and is near Gidea Park station.

History 
In 1990, Class 321 EMUs were seen at the depot as well as Class 315s.

Present 
As of 2023, the depot has no allocation. It was, a stabling point for Elizabeth line Class 315 EMUs until 2022.

References 

Railway sidings in England
Rail transport in London